The 1974–75 Scottish Inter-District Championship was a rugby union competition for Scotland's district teams.

This season saw the 22nd Scottish Inter-District Championship.

North and Midlands and Glasgow District shared the competition with 2 wins and 1 loss.

The SRU allowed substitutes to be used in inter-district matches.

The Probables versus Possibles match was played in three thirds of 30 minutes each.

1974-75 League Table

Results

Round 1

South of Scotland: G. A. Fairbairn (Kelso), Drew Gill (Gala), Jim Renwick (Hawick) [captain], Alastair Cranston (Hawick), G. W. Turnbull (Jedforest), Arthur Brown (Gala), Roy Laidlaw (Jedforest) Jim Aitken (Gala), Colin Deans (Hawick), Norman Pender (Hawick), Ian Barnes (Hawick), Alan Tomes (Hawick), R. Lindores (Jedforest), Gordon Dickson (Gala), Tommy Elliot (Langholm)

Glasgow District: A. Campbell (Hillhead), David Shedden (West of Scotland), Michael Hunter (Glasgow HSFP), J. F. G. Stewart (Jordanhill), Lewis Dick (Jordanhill), D. F. Reid (Glasgow Academicals), H. R. McHardy (Kilmarnock), Ian McLauchlan (Jordanhill) [captain], R. F. A. Balfour (Glasgow HSFP), Sandy Carmichael (West of Scotland), I. A. Gray (West of Scotland), D. Gray (West of Scotland), Richie Dixon (Jordanhill), D. M. Gilmore (Glasgow HSFP), R. Haldane (West of Scotland)

Round 2

South of Scotland: Arthur Brown (Gala), Drew Gill (Gala), Jim Renwick (Hawick) [captain], Alastair Cranston (Hawick), A. B. White (Hawick), Colin Telfer (Hawick) [captain], Roy Laidlaw (Jedforest), Jim Aitken (Gala), Colin Deans (Hawick), B. Hislop (Langholm), Ian Barnes (Hawick), Alan Tomes (Hawick), R. Lindores (Jedforest), Gordon Dickson (Gala), Tommy Elliot (Langholm) Replacement: Harry Carruthers (Gala) for A. B. White (Hawick)

Edinburgh District: Bruce Hay (Boroughmuir), Andy Irvine (Heriots), Graham Hogg (Boroughmuir) [captain], Ian Forsyth (Stewarts Melville), J. Dunney (Boroughmuir), F. N. Dall (Heriots), K. J. W. Smith (Boroughmuir), W. S. Noble (Boroughmuir), J. C. Munro (Heriots), J. A. Stewart (Watsonians), M. Kennedy (Watsonians), Iain Lambie (Watsonians), A. Ingle-Finch (Boroughmuir), Bill Watson (Boroughmuir), N. M. Morrison (Boroughmuir)

Round 3

Edinburgh District:

Glasgow District: 

North and Midlands: 

South of Scotland:

Round 4

North and Midlands: 

Edinburgh District:

Round 5

Glasgow District: 

North and Midlands:

Matches outwith the Championship

Other Scottish matches

Renfrewshire: 

Ayrshire: 

Edinburgh District: 

Anglo-Scots: 

North of Scotland: 

Midlands District: 

North and Midlands: W. D. Aitchison (Highland), T. D. Dunlop (Dunfermline), M. B. Paul (Dunfermline), J. Adams (Dunfermline), D. I. Oliver (Gordonians), D. W. Arneil (Dunfermline) [captain], N. B. Leitch (Dunfermline), T. E. R. Young (Moray), A. S. Fraser (Highland), R. D. Young (Dunfermline), C. E. Snape (Gordonians), C. A. Galbraith (Dunfermline), I. D. Coull (Perthshire), George Mackie (Highland), David Leslie (Dundee HSFP)

Anglo-Scots: R. S. Money (Leicester), J. P. D. Macdonald (London Scottish), A. P. Friell (London Scottish), S. M. Griffin (Gosforth), D. G. Fowlie (London Scottish), R. Wilson (London Scottish), Alan Lawson (London Scottish), D. Fairbairn (London Scottish), D. S. Madsen (Gosforth), M. S. Lovett (London Scottish), Alastair McHarg (London Scottish) [captain], P. R. Hay (London Scottish), R. A. Mackenzie (London Scottish), R. W. M. Whitefield (London Scottish), J. G. Millican (Moseley)

Glasgow District: 

Anglo-Scots:

Trial matches

Probables: D. Aitchison (Highland), W. C. C. Steele (London Scottish), J. M. Renwick (Hawick), I. R. McGeechan (Headingley), L. G. Dick (Jordanhill), C. Telfer (Hawick) [captain], A. J. M. Lawson (London Scottish), J. Aitken (Gala), R. F. A. Balfour (Glasgow HSFP), N. A. K. Pender (Hawick), A. J. Tomes (Hawick), I. A. Barnes (Hawick), N. A. McEwan (Highland), D. S. Watson (Boroughmuir), W. Lauder (Neath) Replacement: Alan Friell (London Scottish) moved from Possibles to play for Probables to replace Ian McGeechan; the tight five of Ian McLauchlan, D. F. Madsen, Sandy Carmichael, McHarg and Brown were promoted in the second third; Leslie and Biggar were promoted in the second third; Morgan was promoted to Probables in the last third. 

Possibles: B. Hay (Boroughmuir), A. D. Gill (Gala), A. P. Friell (London Scottish), A. Dougan (Jordanhill), T. D. Dunlop (Dunfermline), R. Wilson (London Scottish), D. Morgan (Stewart's Melville) [captain], Ian McLauchlan (Jordanhill), D. F. Madsen (Gorforth), Sandy Carmichael (West of Scotland), A. F. McHarg (London Scottish), G. L. Brown (West of Scotland), R. A. Mackenzie (London Scottish), D. G. Leslie (Dundee HSFP), M. A. Biggar (London Scottish) Replacement: M. Hunter (Glasgow HSFP) replaced A. Dougan; David Bell (Watsonians) replaced Friell when he moved to play for Probables; McEwen and Watson were demoted in the second third; Balfour was demoted to Possibles in the last third.

Reserves in attendance as possible replacements: A. H. White (Hawick), M. D. Hunter (Glasgow HSFP), D. L. Bell (Watsonians), H. R. McHardy (Kilmarnock), A. C. Wilson (West of Scotland), C. D. Fisher (Waterloo), D. J. M. Smith (Glasgow HSFP), R. J. Dixon (Jordanhill), A. J. Preston (Gosforth and Newcastle University)

English matches

Edinburgh District: 

Northumberland: 

Scottish Borders: 

Durham County: 

Glasgow District: 

Cumberland and Westmorland: 

Cumberland and Westmorland: 

Edinburgh District:

International matches

Glasgow District: 

Tonga:

References

1974–75 in Scottish rugby union
Scottish Inter-District Championship seasons